The Tantive IV Alderaan Diplomatic Envoy  (also referred to by its model as the CR90 Corellian corvette or simply as the Rebel Blockade Runner) is a fictional spaceship in the Star Wars film series.  Designed by the Corellian Engineering Corporation (CEC), the highly modified CR90 corvette is designed to be utilitarian, durable, modular, with its simplistic interiors featuring subtle luxury for Alderaan officials. It was used by Leia Organa in the original Star Wars film and was the first vessel audiences saw when Star Wars premiered in 1977. Other CR90 Corellian corvettes, which share the Tantive IV's design, appear in Return of the Jedi and in the Star Wars expanded universe's books, comics, TV series, and games.

Origin and design
The ship's design stems from initial concepts for the Millennium Falcon. When Space: 1999 featured a ship called an Eagle Transporter with an appearance similar to the Industrial Light & Magic's Falcon design, the model makers redesigned the Falcon and adapted the initial design for the Tantive IV. The revised model was scaled down, with replacements for outsized components and a different cockpit. This also explains the 194-centimeter model's intricacy, which would have been necessary for depicting the prominent Falcon. Although not visible in the first Star Wars film, modelmakers hung a miniature Playboy centerfold on the cockpit's starboard bulkhead. The Tantive IV was the last model completed for the film.  A smaller 16-inch model was also made for the shot of the craft receding into the distance.  A separate model was needed for this because of the limited length of the Dykstraflex track used. That model has lights for the eleven engines to give the illusion of exhausts.  The miniature model was in the collection of Grant McCune until he died in 2010 and it was then sold at auction in 2015 for a record sum of $450,000.    

The model was altered slightly for Return of the Jedi, with the addition of windows along the ship's spine and larger weapons. These modifications were removed in the 1990s. The Republic cruiser in Star Wars: Episode I – The Phantom Menace was designed to be reminiscent of the Tantive IVs shape.

Depiction

The Tantive IV first appears in the opening of Star Wars as it is captured by the Imperial I-class Star Destroyer Devastator over Tatooine. The ship was carrying Princess Leia and the plans for the Empire's Death Star battle station. Leia had taken the ship to Tatooine to recruit the Jedi Master Obi-Wan Kenobi to join the rebellion. Unable to find Kenobi herself, Leia gives the plans and a message to R2-D2, who escapes with C-3PO in an escape pod and lands on Tatooine. According to the Star Wars Encyclopedia, the ship was subsequently destroyed by Darth Vader; this plotline is now part of the non-canon Legends timeline.

The vessel appears at the end of Rogue One (2016), with the film's final scenes depicting how the Death Star plans reached the ship and Leia beginning their journey to Tatooine. The film's novelization further states that the ship was meant to take part in the Battle of Scarif, but had been docked for repairs aboard Admiral Raddus' ship, the MC75 Star Cruiser Profundity. Once the battle was finished, the ship would head to Tatooine to deliver Bail Organa's request for help to Obi-Wan Kenobi. However, Tantive IV was forced to launch before repairs were completed due to the capture of the Profundity and in order to protect the newly stolen Death Star plans from Darth Vader. Although they were able to elude Vader initially, damage sustained during the escape and the still-unrepaired malfunctions allowed Vader's ship to disable and catch them above Tatooine.

The ship makes a return in Star Wars: The Rise of Skywalker as the center of the Resistance's base and during the final battle on Exegol as part of the Resistance's initial attack fleet. It was one of the ships hit by Palpatine's Force lightning assault, and although the fate of the ship and its pilot, Nien Nunb, are not mentioned in the movie, it is presumed to be destroyed and Nunb lost. This supposition was confirmed by the novelization's author, Rae Carson.

Name
The ship was initially referred to as the "Rebel blockade runner", and National Public Radio's radio adaptation of A New Hope in 1981 reveals the name "Tantive IV" (pronounced 'Tan-tiv-ee four'). Star Wars Expanded Universe material initially referred to the class of ships as "Corellian corvettes", but Lucasfilm later identified them as Alderaan Cruisers. The name Tantive IV was used in various merchandise as well as the official Rogue One novelization. The name may be derived from the term tantivy, referring to a rapid gallop or blaring of horns, associated with the sport of Fox hunting, suggesting the Tantive IV's role in the early scenes of A New Hope as the hunters' quarry.

Games and models
Both Decipher, Inc. and Wizards of the Coast published Tantive IV and Corellian corvette cards for the Star Wars Customizable Card Game and Star Wars Trading Card Game, respectively.

A small Lego model of the Tantive IV is included with the Ultimate Collector series 3,000-piece Star Destroyer which, at the time of its 2002 release was Lego's largest set.  In 2019, to celebrate the 20th anniversary of such models, Lego released a large model of the Tantive IV with 1,768 pieces.  This model was the first to include dark red bricks. 

Two Micro Machines three-packs included a Corellian corvette toy, and Hasbro's Collector Fleet line included an electronic blockade runner.

Kenner's Die Cast Star Destroyer from 1979 includes a miniature Tantive IV that can be inserted into a docking bay under the Star Destroyer.

The Tantive IV also appears as a ship model in both the X-Wing miniatures game and Star Wars Armada produced by Fantasy Flight Games. A  miniature of the Tantive IV sold at auction for $450,000, making it the most expensive Star Wars item sold at auction.

References

Footnotes

Citations

External links
 
 
 

Star Wars spacecraft